The St. Louis Cardinals are a Major League Baseball (MLB) franchise based in St. Louis, Missouri. They play in the National League Central division. The first game of the new baseball season for a team is played on Opening Day, and being named the Opening Day starter is an honor, which is often given to the player who is expected to lead the pitching staff that season, though there are various strategic reasons why a team's best pitcher might not start on Opening Day. As of 2008, The Cardinals have used 71 different Opening Day starting pitchers in their 128 seasons. No decisions are only awarded to the starting pitcher if the game is won or lost after the starting pitcher has left the game. Although in modern baseball, ties are rare due to extra innings.

Bob Gibson holds the Cardinals record for most Opening Day starts with ten.

Key

Pitchers

References

External links
St. Louis Cardinals Opening Day Starters and Results - Baseball-Reference.com

Lists of Major League Baseball Opening Day starting pitchers
Opening day starters